Chanae is a district (amphoe) in the southern part of Narathiwat province, southern Thailand.

History
Tambons Dusong Yo and Chanae were separated from Ra-ngae district to create Chanae minor district (king amphoe) on 15 July 1983.
It was upgraded to a full district on 1 January 1988.

Chanae is the Malay name of a native Colocasia species.

Geography
Neighboring districts are (from the west clockwise): Betong, and Than To of Yala province; Sisakhon, Ra-ngae,  and Sukhirin of Narathiwat province and the state Perak of Malaysia.

Demographics
In 1963, the Thai government launched the Nikhom Sang Ton Eng Pak Tai ('self-development community in the south') program to move families from Thailand's northeastern and central provinces to the Chanae and Sukhirin Districts of Narathiwat. A total of 5,633 families were relocated to Narathiwat, where each family was rewarded with 18 rai of land.

Administration

Central administration 
Chanae is divided into four sub-districts (tambons), which are further subdivided into 31 administrative villages (mubans).

Local administration 
There are four sub-district administrative organizations (SAO) in the district:
 Chanae consisting of sub-district Chanae.
 Dusongyo consisting of sub-district Dusongyo.
 Phadung Mat consisting of sub-district Phadung Mat.
 Chang Phueak consisting of sub-district Chang Phueak.

References

External links
amphoe.com

Districts of Narathiwat province